The Central Connecticut Blue Devils women's basketball team represents Central Connecticut State University in New Britain, Connecticut, United States. The school's team currently competes in the Northeast Conference.

History
Central Connecticut began play in 1971. They played in Division II from 1971-1986. As of the end of the 2015-16 season, the Blue Devils have an all-time record of 467-673. They have never made the NCAA Tournament, but they have made the WNIT in 2009 and 2015.

Head coach Beryl Piper was placed on administrative leave on January 16, 2020. In May 2020 Piper announced her retirement from CCSU. She retires as the most winning head coach in CCSU women's basketball history. Assistant coach Kerri Reaves has taken over the head coaching position on an interim basis.

Season-by-season results
{| class="wikitable"

|- align="center"

|-style="background: #ffffdd;"
| colspan="8" align="center" | Division I

Postseason

NCAA Division II tournament results
The Blue Devils made one appearance in the NCAA Division II women's basketball tournament. They had a combined record of 1–1.

WNIT results

References

External links